The 1992 All-Ireland Junior Hurling Championship was the 62nd staging of the All-Ireland Junior Championship, the Gaelic Athletic Association's second tier Gaelic football championship.

Kerry entered the championship as the defending champions, however, they were beaten by Cork in the Munster quarter-final.

The All-Ireland final was played on 2 August 1992 at Walsh Park in Waterford, between Cork and Wexford, in what was their first ever meeting in the final. Wexford won the match by 1-09 to 0-11 to claim their first ever championship title.

Results

All-Ireland Junior Football Championship

All-Ireland semi-finals

All-Ireland final

References

Junior
All-Ireland Junior Football Championship